The Wonder Years is an American coming-of-age comedy television series developed by Saladin K. Patterson that premiered on ABC on September 22, 2021. Inspired by the 1988 series of the same title, it stars Elisha "EJ" Williams as Dean Williams, and follows his life as he grows up in Montgomery, Alabama, in the late 1960s. Don Cheadle lends his voice as the narrator for the series as the adult counterpart of Dean. In May 2022, the series was renewed for a second season. It is currently streaming on Disney+.

Premise
The Wonder Years is set in the late 1960s and takes a nostalgic look at the Williams family, Black middle-class residents of Montgomery, Alabama, through the point of view of imaginative 12-year-old Dean.

Cast

Main
 Elisha "EJ" Williams as Dean Williams
 Don Cheadle narrates as an older Dean
 Dulé Hill as Bill Williams, Dean's father
 Saycon Sengbloh as Lillian Williams, Dean's mother
 Laura Kariuki as Kim Williams, Dean's sister
 Amari O'Neil as Cory Long, Dean's friend
 Julian Lerner as Brad Hitman, Dean's friend
 Milan Ray as Keisa Clemmons, Dean's friend who he has a secret crush on

Recurring
 Caleb Black as Norman
 Allen Maldonado as Coach Long, a baseball coach
 Milan Marsh as Charlene
 Charity Jordan as Vivian Long
 Andrew Tull as Hampton
 Sami Bray as Future Karen

Guest
 Richard Gant as Grandaddy Clisby
 Spence Moore II as Bruce Williams, Dean's older brother

Episodes

Production

The Wonder Years was announced on July 8, 2020, when ABC gave the project a pilot order with Fred Savage, the star of the original series, attached to direct and executive produce. In January 2021, the pilot was confirmed, with production taking place in Atlanta, Georgia. In March 2021, Saycon Sengbloh, Elisha "EJ" Williams, Dulé Hill, Laura Kariuki, Milan Ray, Julian Lerner, and Amari O'Neil joined the cast, with Don Cheadle announced to serve as the show's narrator. On May 14, 2021, The Wonder Years was given a series order. In July, Allen Maldonado was cast in a recurring role.

At a Television Critics Association panel discussion in August 2021, crew members revealed that the series would tackle major events from 1968, including the assassination of Martin Luther King Jr. When asked about casting Maldonado, whose character at the time was speculated to be Afro-Latino like Maldonado, writer and executive producer Saladin K. Patterson said they "wanted to represent the diaspora of Blackness for sure. And some of that is in appearance and looks but some of it is just in the background and those individual stories that come from those mixes of cultures. He certainly fits into that tableau that we want to set." The first season was originally given a 9-episode order. On October 26, 2021, the first season was expanded to a full season of 22 episodes. In November 2021, it was reported Richard Gant and Spence Moore II would also star.

In May 2022, Savage was fired from his roles as executive producer and director after allegations of inappropriate conduct, including "verbal outbursts and inappropriate behavior". Seven days later, ABC renewed the series for a second season.

Release
In the U.S., the series premiered on ABC on September 22, 2021, airing on Wednesdays at 8:30pm, with availability the next day on Hulu. In Canada, the series aired on CTV. The series premiered as an original series in selected countries on Disney+ via Star on June 1. In Latin America, the series debuted on Disney+ as a Disney+ exclusive. On November 8, 2021, Hollywood Records made the show's theme song available to stream and download. The song is written by Roahn Hylton and Jacob Yoffee and features vocals by Scotty Granger.

Reception

Critical response
 Metacritic, which uses a weighted average, assigned a score of 75 out of 100 based on 18 critics, indicating "generally favorable reviews."

The pilot episode was given to critics to review the series ahead of its premiere. In their review for Variety, Daniel D'Addario said that while parts of the 22-minute pilot felt "rushed," its focus on the time period made "its characters' relationships feel vivid and real against the backdrop of changing times." In his final points, D'Addario gave positive feedback to the cast and said "the pilot's final insight is nicely communicated." The Hollywood Reporter Angie Han had similar comments, writing, "the series manages to invoke nostalgia for bygone days while also remaining relatively clear-eyed about the challenges of that period ... and it accomplishes this while delivering the cozy appeal of the best family sitcoms." Jen Chaney of Vulture stated The Wonder Years succeeds both at honoring its source material and providing something on its own, stating the series is one of the few reboots that is handled with "care, intelligence, and clear intention," writing, "This is what a smart reboot does: It builds upon what came before and honors the legacy of the original while doing something new and different. It seeks to illuminate and not just re-create. It proves that sometimes something worthwhile can be shaped out of the familiar, as long as the process is in the right hands. And The Wonder Years is certainly in some good ones."

Rebecca Nicholson of The Guardian gave the series a grade of 4 out of 5 stars and found it to be a charming and funny reboot, praising the humor and the characters, writing, "Happily, The Wonder Years has been done with care and innovation, and taps into the nostalgic appeal of the original late 80s/early 90s sitcom, while carving out a new path." Joyce Slaton of Common Sense Media rated the series 4 out of 5, praised the depiction of positive messages and role models, citing integrity and dignity, and applauded the diverse representations across the characters. Dave Nemetz of TVLine gave the pilot episode a "B," praising The Wonder Years for its vintage soundtrack, comedic tone, and focus on minorities for a story set in the 1960s. Nemetz summarized the series as "a decent enough remake, but one that lacks the groundbreaking verve of the original and pulls its punches a bit."

Ratings

Accolades

References

External links
 
 

2020s American black sitcoms
2020s American comedy-drama television series
2020s American teen sitcoms
2021 American television series debuts
American Broadcasting Company original programming
Coming-of-age television shows
English-language television shows
Middle school television series
Mass media portrayals of the middle class
Period family drama television series
Television series about families
Television series about teenagers
Television series by 20th Century Fox Television
Television series reboots
Television shows set in Alabama
Television series set in the 1960s